Dick Shawn (born Richard Schulefand, December 1, 1923 – April 17, 1987) was an American actor and comedian. He played a wide variety of supporting roles and was a prolific character actor. During the 1960s, he played small roles in madcap comedies, usually portraying caricatures of counter culture personalities, such as the hedonistic but mother-obsessed Sylvester Marcus in It's a Mad, Mad, Mad, Mad World (1963), and the hippie actor Lorenzo Saint DuBois ("L.S.D.")  in The Producers (1967).  Besides his film work, he appeared in numerous television shows from the 1960s through the 1980s.

Career

Born in Buffalo, New York and raised in nearby Lackawanna, Shawn performed his stand-up comedy act for over 35 years in nightclubs around the world. His award-winning one-man stage show, The Second Greatest Entertainer in the Whole Wide World, was sometimes performed with a unique opening. When the audience entered the theater, they saw a bare stage with a pile of bricks in stage center. When the play began, Shawn emerged from the pile of bricks. The startling effect of this required complete concentration and breath control because the slightest movement of the bricks could ruin the surprise appearance.

In addition to roles in more than 30 movies and seven Broadway productions, Shawn made television appearances, toured often, and periodically performed a one-man show that mixed songs, sketches, and pantomime. He was a speaker at the Friars Club Roasts in Los Angeles and New York. At one of the X-rated roasts (a 1986 Playboy roast of Tommy Chong) that had overdosed on tasteless routines by previous speakers, Shawn walked up to the microphone, took a long pause, and "vomited" pea soup onto himself and other speakers at the dais.

In the Mel Brooks 1967 movie The Producers, Shawn won accolades for his portrayal of Lorenzo St. DuBois, whose "friends call" him LSD, an actor auditioning for and winning the part of Hitler in a theatrical production that was intentionally meant to fail.

Shawn's television appearances included The Ed Sullivan Show, TV movies, sitcoms (including Three's Company on which he played Jack Tripper's father), dramas including St. Elsewhere and Magnum, P.I., and a music video for "Dance" by the hair metal band Ratt (1986). In the UK he appeared in Sunday Night at the London Palladium in 1958.

Amongst his roles in anthology TV series, he starred in an Amazing Stories episode "Miss Stardust", directed by Tobe Hooper, about a bizarre intergalactic beauty pageant, and played the Emperor in The Emperor's New Clothes for Shelley Duvall's Faerie Tale Theatre. He filled in for vacationing Johnny Carson as guest host on The Tonight Show Starring Johnny Carson on January 1, 1971, which saw the airing of the last cigarette commercial on American television (for Virginia Slims), one minute before the cigarette ads were banned.

Personal life
Shawn married Rita Bachner in 1946, and they had four children: Amy, Wendy (married to John Travolta's older brother Joey Travolta), Adam, and Jennifer. He had one grandchild, Rachel Travolta. He was a longtime resident of Englewood, New Jersey.

Death
On April 17, 1987, during a performance at University of California, San Diego's Mandeville Hall, Shawn suffered a heart attack and collapsed face-down on the stage. The audience initially assumed that it was part of his act; but after he had remained motionless on the stage for several minutes, a stage hand examined him and asked if a physician was present.

After CPR had been initiated, the audience was asked to leave the auditorium. Most in attendance remained, still assuming that it was all part of Shawn's act and only began leaving after paramedics arrived. A notice in the following day's San Diego Union newspaper announced that Shawn had died during the performance at the age of 63. Shawn was interred at Hillside Memorial Park, a Jewish cemetery in Culver City, California.

Legacy
Jim Knipfel claims that Andy Kaufman was inspired by Shawn.

Actor Matthew Glave portrayed Shawn in Leave 'Em Laughing, a short film surrounding his final moments.

Filmography

Film

Television

Theatre

References

External links

 

Jewish American male actors
Jewish American comedians
American male comedians
People from Englewood, New Jersey
Burials at Hillside Memorial Park Cemetery
Deaths onstage
1923 births
1987 deaths
Jewish male comedians
20th-century American male actors
Male actors from Buffalo, New York
People from Lackawanna, New York
Comedians from New York (state)
20th-century American comedians
20th-century American Jews